Ipimorpha subtusa, the olive, is a moth of the family Noctuidae. It is found in the Palearctic realm (Europe, Russia, Turkey, Siberia, Russian Far East, Mongolia, China, Korea, and Japan).

Technical description and variation

The wingspan is 27–30 mm. The length of the forewings is 14–16 mm. Forewing with outcurved termen. Forewing olive grey-brown; inner and outer lines outwards directed, the inner straight, the outer slightly curved, pale yellow; the costal edge also yellow; the median shade obscure; the submarginal line faint, with a dark shade before it; the stigmata with pale margins; hindwing dark grey, with the fringe pale; the ab. pallida Tutt is a colourless pale grey form without any rufous or fuscous admixture.

Biology

The moth flies in one generation from mid-June to mid-September .The spherical, yellowish egg is flattened at the base. It is covered with strong, slightly serrated ribs, about half of which reach the very small, recessed micropyl zone. Larva pale yellowish green; dorsal line broadly, subdorsal narrowly yellowish; spiracular line pale yellow; head yellow marked with black. The larvae feed between the united leaves of aspen and other poplar species.
The pupa is reddish brown in colour and has two almost straight, diverging thorns on the kremaster.

Notes
The flight season refers to Belgium and The Netherlands. This may vary in other parts of the range.

References

External links

The Olive at UKmoths
 Funet Taxonomy
Fauna Europaea
Lepiforum.de
Vlindernet.nl 

Caradrinini
Moths of Japan
Moths of Europe
Moths of Asia
Taxa named by Michael Denis
Taxa named by Ignaz Schiffermüller